North Trafford may refer to:
The area of Trafford, in Greater Manchester, England, which lies north of the River Mersey
 North Trafford, early name of Trafford F.C., football club in Grater Manchester, England
 North Trafford College, college which merged into Trafford College in 2007